Shackman "Shacky" Tauro (28 June 1959 – 17 June 2009) was a Zimbabwean football player and coach.

Career

Playing career
Tauro, who played as a striker, spent his entire professional career with CAPS United, and also earned international caps for Zimbabwe.

He was named the Rhodesian Soccer Star of the Year in 1979.

Coaching career
Tauro coached Blackpool, Arcadia United, CAPS United, Circle United, the Zimbabwe women's national team, and Shooting Stars.

References

General
Obituary – All Africa
Obituary – New Zimbabwe

Specific

1959 births
2009 deaths
CAPS United players
Rhodesian footballers
Zimbabwean footballers
Zimbabwe international footballers
Zimbabwean football managers

Association football forwards